Irish Treaty of Lisbon referendum may refer to:

 Twenty-eighth Amendment of the Constitution Bill 2008, a failed proposal to ratify the Treaty of Lisbon, held on 12 June 2008
 Twenty-eighth Amendment of the Constitution of Ireland, a second referendum to ratify the Treaty of Lisbon, held on 2 October 2009

See also
 Ratification of the Treaty of Lisbon